This is a list of National Historic Sites in the province of Alberta.  As of March 2018, there are 61 National Historic Sites designated in Alberta, 16 of which are owned or administered by Parks Canada (identified below by the beaver icon ).  The first three sites in Alberta were designated in 1923: the site of rival trading posts Fort Augustus and Fort Edmonton, the site of the Frog Lake Massacre and the site of the first outpost of the North-West Mounted Police in Western Canada at Fort Macleod.

Numerous National Historic Events also occurred across Alberta, and are identified at places associated with them, using the same style of federal plaque which marks National Historic Sites. Several National Historic Persons are commemorated throughout the province in the same way.

This list uses names designated by the Historic Sites and Monuments Board of Canada, which may differ from other names for these sites.

National Historic Sites

Former National Historic Sites in Alberta

See also

History of Alberta
Provincial historic sites of Alberta

References

 
Alberta
 National Historic Sites of Canada